Ebrahimabad Abu Talab (also Romanized as Ebrāhīmābād Ābū Tālab; also known as Ebrāhīmābād) is a village in Hokmabad Rural District, Atamalek District, Jowayin County, Razavi Khorasan Province, Iran. At the 2006 census, its population was 601, in 138 families.

References 

Populated places in Joveyn County